Thomas Kirk Kristiansen (born 18 February 1979) is a Danish fourth-generation owner of The Lego Group. Together with his father Kjeld, and sisters Agnete and Sofie, they split ownership of a 75% stake in the company.

Among the children of Kjeld Kirk Kristiansen, Thomas is the one who takes the most active part in managing the company. In 2007, he joined the board of directors of the LEGO Foundation. In 2016, Thomas Kristiansen became deputy chairman of the company, and in 2020 he was appointed Chairman of the Board of Directors.
 
Thomas is married to the tournament rider Signe Kirk Kristiansen with whom he has a daughter.
 
Thomas Kristiansen made the 2022 Forbes Billionaires List with an estimated wealth of $8.2 billion and occupied the 267th position.

References 

 

1979 births
Living people
Danish businesspeople
Danish billionaires
20th-century Danish businesspeople
21st-century Danish businesspeople